Home Sweet Home is a 2013 Philippine television drama fantasy series broadcast by GMA Network. Directed by Gil Tejada Jr., it stars Raymart Santiago, Roxanne Guinoo, Jake Vargas, Bea Binene and Jillian Ward. It premiered on April 22, 2013 on the network's Telebabad line up. The series on July 19, 2013 with a total of 64 episodes. It was replaced by Binoy Henyo in its timeslot.

Premise
The series revolves around the Caharian family and their magical adventures and misadventures as they explore and unravel the mysteries behind an old and abandoned house. In the story, whoever enters the old house will be trapped inside and a fake version (a doppelganger with opposite personality of the real one) will come out.

Cast and characters

Lead cast
 Raymart Santiago as Reden Caharian
 Roxanne Guinoo as Dulce Caharian
 Jake Vargas as Benjie Caharian
 Bea Binene as Lucy Buena
 Jillian Ward as Jessie Caharian

Supporting cast
 Rain Quite as Ivan Caharian
 Celia Rodriguez as Pandora
 Gladys Reyes as Agoncilla Caharian
 Rochelle Pangilinan as Wendy del Valle
 Teejay Marquez as Coco Buena
 Shermaine Santiago as Dessa Buena
 Arthur Solinap and Patricia Ysmael as Kulay and Mikay
 Marky Lopez as Caloy
 Ernie Zarate as Duarte Caharian
 Ken Chan as Dane
 Buboy Villar as Django
 Arkin Magalona as Arko Buena
 Elle Ramirez as Chinggay

Guest cast
 Lorna Tolentino as Azon
 Gerald Madrid as Gabby Buena
 Ricky Davao as Manolo
 Dinkee Doo, Jr. as Sidyo
 Alessandra De Rossi as the Ice Queen
 Marita Zobel as a witch
 Juancho Trivino as Adonis
 Yassi Pressman as Ella

Production and development
The series was conceptualized and developed by RJ Nuevas in early March 2013. The show's working title was "Bahay na Bato" (literally means House of Stone) before being changed to Home Sweet Home. The show's key target demographic were children (6-12 year old age) and preteens to adolescents (13-19 year old age), and aimed to entertain in a positive manner, at the same time inculcating traditional Filipino values and practices, such as importance of honesty, respect for parental authority, importance of a strong  family and sportsmanship.

The series is executive produced by Joy Lumboy-Pili and directed by Gil Tejada, Jr. Although predominantly a family drama, the program does have some fantasy-adventure, comedic and thriller overtones. The story revolves mainly around the Caharian family, and their adventures and misadventures inside an old enchanted house—the most significant aspect of the series, both the main setting and the focus of the story's themes. Every door in that house leads to a new world (reminiscent of The Chronicles of Narnia). There, they will meet some lovable mythical creatures, as well as ferocious fiends, that will either help them or keep them from getting back into the real world. The show also highlights several characters [such as relatives, friends, neighbors of the core family] and their personal and background stories.

The cast came first before the concept of the show. The first actor to be cast was Raymart Santiago who played Reden Caharian. In an interview, Santiago—who has previously starred in the network's family-friendly programs Bantatay and Futbolilits—revealed that he also contributed some creative input to make series even better. He also asked his children to help him decide on the kind of role he would take in the [new] show. Roxanne Guinoo was chosen to play Dulce Caharian. She said she easily accepted the role because, first, it's a mother role and "I want to explore the idea of having grown up kids. And it's very light. My kids will also get to see the show."

Reception

Ratings
According to AGB Nielsen Philippines' Mega Manila household television ratings, the pilot episode of Home Sweet Home earned a 10.5% rating. While the final episode scored a 15.3% rating.

Critical response
Aside from ratings, the series, as well as its actors were praised by both critical and mainstream critics. Mario E. Bautista of Malaya praised Raymart Santiago's acting performance, stated that "Raymart has become a very good actor as shown in his dual roles in Home Sweet Home. He plays two different characters as the real Reden (imprisoned in the haunted house battling dragons) and the fake Reden (who can be mean to people around him but pretends to be harmless in front of wife Roxanne Guinoo). We think he deserves to be nominated as best actor in the coming TV awards for his performance in this show."

Accolades

References

External links
 

2013 Philippine television series debuts
2013 Philippine television series endings
Fantaserye and telefantasya
Filipino-language television shows
GMA Network drama series
Television shows set in the Philippines